is the seventh album by Mucc, released on December 6, 2006 in Japan and on February 23, 2007 in Europe.  The first press edition comes with a second disc, containing two bonus tracks. These were also included on the single disc of the European release. The album reached number 22 on the Oricon chart.

Track listing

Note
 Re-recording of "Utagoe" and "Ryūsei" were featured on their 2017 self-cover album Koroshi no Shirabe II This is NOT Greatest Hits.

Covers 
"Utagoe", "Gerbera", and "Ryūsei" were covered by Kishidan, sukekiyo and Plastic Tree respectively, on the 2017 Mucc tribute album Tribute Of Mucc -en-.

References 

Mucc albums
2006 albums